The Corn Belt is a region of the Midwestern United States that, since the 1850s, has dominated corn production in the United States. In the United States, corn is the common word for maize. More generally, the concept of the Corn Belt connotes the area of the Midwest dominated by farming and agriculture.

Geography
There is lack of consensus regarding the constituents of the Corn Belt, although it often includes: Iowa, Illinois, Indiana, southern Michigan, western Ohio, eastern Nebraska, eastern Kansas, southern Minnesota, and parts of Missouri. It also sometimes includes: South Dakota, North Dakota, all of Ohio, Wisconsin, all of Michigan, and Kentucky. Some people and industries break the corn belt down even further and refer to it as the Eastern Corn Belt and the Western Corn Belt. 

The region is characterized by level land, deep fertile soils, and a high organic soil concentration.

As of 2008, the top four corn-producing states were Iowa, Illinois, Nebraska, and Minnesota, accounting for more than half of the corn growth in the United States.

More recently, the USA corn belt was mapped at the county level using the Land use and Agricultural Management Practices web-Service (LAMPS), along with animated maps of changes in time (2010-2016).

History
On account of new agricultural technology developments between 1860 and 1970, the Corn Belt went from producing mixed crops and livestock into becoming an area focused strictly on wheat-cash planting. After 1970, increased crop and meat production required an export outlet, but global recession and a strong dollar reduced exports and created serious problems even for the best farm managers.

In 1956, former Vice President Henry A. Wallace, a pioneer of hybrid seed, declared that the Corn Belt has developed the "most productive agricultural civilization the world has ever seen".

Most corn grown today is fed to livestock, especially hogs and poultry. In recent decades soybeans have grown in importance. 

By 1950, 99% of corn has been grown from hybrids.

EPA Ecoregion
In 1997, the USEPA published its report on United States' ecoregions, in part based on "land use". Its "Level III" region classification contains three contiguous "Corn Belt" regions, Western (47), Central (54), and Eastern (55), stretching from Indiana to eastern Nebraska.

Panoramic view

See also

 Banana Belt
 Breadbasket
 Canadian Prairies, Canada's 'Breadbasket'
 Central Black Earth Region, segment of the Eurasian chernozem belt that lies within Central Russia 
 Palliser's Triangle, Canada's semi-arid grain production region
 Peak wheat

References

Further reading
 Anderson, J. L. Industrializing the Corn Belt: Agriculture, Technology, and Environment, 1945-1972 (2009) 238 pp. 
 Bogue, Allan. From Prairie to Corn Belt: Farming on the Illinois and Iowa Prairies in the Nineteenth Century (1963) excerpt and text search
 Cayton, Andrew, et al. eds. The American Midwest: An Interpretive Encyclopedia (2006) excerpt and text search
 Hart, John Fraser. "Change in the Corn Belt", Geographical Review, Jan 1986, Vol. 76#1 pp. 51–72
 Hudson, John C. Making the Corn Belt: A Geographical History of Middle-Western Agriculture (1994)
 Power, Richard Lyle. Planting Corn Belt Culture: The Impress of the Upland Southerner and Yankee in the old Northwest (1953)
 Snapp, Roscoe R. Beef Cattle Their Feeding and Management in the Corn Belt States (1950)
 Smith, C. Wayne, et al. Corn: Origin, History, Technology, and Production (2004) online edition
 Wallace, Henry Agard. Henry A. Wallace's Irrigation Frontier: On the Trail of the Corn Belt Farmer 1909 15 articles written by Wallace in 1909; 1991 edition edited by Richard Lowitt, and Judith Fabry

Agricultural production in the United States
Agriculture in Illinois
Agriculture in Indiana
Agriculture in Iowa
Agriculture in Kansas
Agriculture in Kentucky
Agriculture in Michigan
Agriculture in Minnesota
Agriculture in Missouri
Agriculture in Nebraska
Agriculture in North Dakota
Agriculture in Ohio
Agriculture in South Dakota
Agriculture in Wisconsin
Economy of the Midwestern United States
Midwestern United States
Belt regions of the United States
Maize production
Agricultural belts
Ecoregions of Illinois
Ecoregions of Indiana
Ecoregions of Iowa
Ecoregions of Kansas
Ecoregions of Michigan
Ecoregions of Minnesota
Ecoregions of Missouri
Ecoregions of Nebraska
Ecoregions of South Dakota
Ecoregions of Wisconsin